Holy Trinity Episcopal Church may refer to:

United States 
(by state)
Holy Trinity Episcopal Church (Fruitland Park, Florida)
Holy Trinity Episcopal Church (Melbourne, Florida)
Holy Trinity Episcopal Church (West Palm Beach, Florida)
Holy Trinity Episcopal Church (Georgetown, Kentucky)
Holy Trinity Episcopal Church (Luverne, Minnesota)
Holy Trinity Episcopal Church (Bowie, Maryland)
Holy Trinity Episcopal Church (Southbridge, Massachusetts)
Holy Trinity Episcopal Church (Manhattan)
Holy Trinity Episcopal Church (Fallon, Nevada), listed on the National Register of Historic Places (NRHP) in Nevada
Holy Trinity Episcopal Church (Spring Lake, New Jersey), NRHP-listed
Holy Trinity Episcopal Church (Greensboro, North Carolina)
Holy Trinity Episcopal Church (Glendale Springs, North Carolina), part of Holy Communion Episcopal Parish (Ashe County, North Carolina)
Holy Trinity Episcopal Church (Swanton, Vermont)
Holy Trinity Episcopal Church (Palouse, Washington), NRHP-listed

See also
 Holy Trinity Church (disambiguation)
 Holy Trinity Anglican Church (disambiguation)